Anthony "Tony" Nuttall (born 25 July 1968) is a former professional rugby league footballer who played in the 1990s. He played at representative level for Ireland, and at club level for Newsome Magpies (in Huddersfield), and Oldham Bears.

International honours
Tony Nuttall won two caps for Ireland in 1995–1997 while at Newsome Magpies, and Oldham Bears + 1-cap (sub).

References

External links
 Statistics at rugbyleagueproject.org
 Statistics at orl-heritagetrust.org.uk

1968 births
Ireland national rugby league team players
Living people
Newsome Panthers players
Oldham R.L.F.C. players
Place of birth missing (living people)